The 1946 Brown Bears football team was an American football team that represented Brown University in the Ivy League during the 1946 college football season.

In their third season under head coach Charles "Rip" Engle, the Bears compiled a 3–5–1 record, and were outscored 184 to 122 by opponents. J. Lalikos was the team captain.  

Brown played its home games at Brown Stadium in Providence, Rhode Island.

Schedule

After the season

The 1947 NFL Draft was held on December 16, 1946. The following Bear was selected.

References

Brown
Brown Bears football seasons
Brown Bears football